German submarine U-362 was a Type VIIC U-boat built for Nazi Germany's Kriegsmarine for service during World War II.

Built by Flensburger Schiffbau-Gesellschaft at Flensburg, the U-boat was laid down 9 November 1941, launched on 21 October 1942, and commissioned on 4 February 1943 with Oberleutnant zur See Ludwig Franz in command.

Design
German Type VIIC submarines were preceded by the shorter Type VIIB submarines. U-362 had a displacement of  when at the surface and  while submerged. She had two shafts and two  propellers.

U-362 was fitted with five  torpedo tubes (four fitted at the bow and one at the stern), fourteen torpedoes, one  SK C/35 naval gun, 220 rounds, and four twin  C/30 anti-aircraft guns. The boat had a complement of between forty-four and sixty.

Service history
Sailing from Kiel on 6 February 1944, U-362 first sailed for northern Norway from where she sortied out into the Norwegian Sea on several patrols, without sinking any ships.

The U-boat sailed from Hammerfest on 2 August 1944, on her fifth and final patrol and headed east across the Barents Sea, north of Russia. All 51 of the crew were lost.

Wolfpacks
U-362 took part in five wolfpacks, namely:
 Werwolf (23 – 27 February 1944) 
 Donner (11 – 12 April 1944) 
 Trutz (16 – 31 May 1944) 
 Grimm (31 May – 6 June 1944) 
 Greif (3 August – 5 September 1944)

References

Bibliography

External links

German Type VIIC submarines
U-boats commissioned in 1943
U-boats sunk in 1944
World War II submarines of Germany
Shipwrecks in the Kara Sea
1942 ships
World War II shipwrecks in the Arctic Ocean
Ships built in Flensburg
U-boats sunk by Soviet warships
U-boats sunk by depth charges
Ships lost with all hands
Maritime incidents in September 1944